Amur Salim Al-Khanjari (born 16 October 2000) is an Omani weightlifter. He represented Oman at the 2020 Summer Olympics in Tokyo, Japan.

References

External links 
 

Living people
2000 births
Omani male weightlifters
Weightlifters at the 2020 Summer Olympics
Olympic weightlifters of Oman
21st-century Omani people